Carl Stockdale also known as Carlton Stockdale (February 19, 1874 – March 15, 1953) was one of the longest-working Hollywood veteran actors, with a career dating from the early 1910s. He also made the difficult transition from silent films to talkies.

Stockdale was born in Worthington, Minnesota, graduated from Minneapolis Central High School, and attended the University of North Dakota.

Before he began working with films, Stockdale was a property man with a repertory theatrical company headed by his brother. He went on to act on stage in repertory theater and in vaudeville.

Stockdale was in Hollywood as early as 1913 with a small role in Gilbert M. Anderson's Broncho Billy's Last Deed. He worked with that film franchise for two years before joining D. W. Griffith's film company. He remained busy into the 1940s. His last film was released in 1943.

Connection to the Murder of William Desmond Taylor
Stockdale told reporters in an interview at his home in 1937 that he was with Charlotte Shelby from 7 to 9 p.m. at her home on February 1, 1922, when William Desmond Taylor was killed.

Personal life
On January 11, 1908, Stockdale married actress Clara Byers. The couple then acted together for two seasons at the Alisky and Grand theaters in Sacramento as members of the Lawrence and Sandusky stock theater troupe. On March 26, 1915, she sued him for divorce.

Filmography

 Broncho Billy's Last Deed (1913) (film debut)
 The Good-for-Nothing (1914) - John Sterling
 The Champion (1915, Short) - Sparring Partner (uncredited)
 A Jitney Elopement (1915, Short) - Cop (uncredited)
 My Best Girl (1915) - Colonel Lane
 The Bank (1915, Short) - Cashier
 Hoodoo Ann (1916) - Gordon Sanderson/Mustang Charley
 A Child of the Paris Streets (1916) - Judge de Tolne
 Casey at the Bat (1916) - Hicks
 Stranded (1916) - Stoner
 Intolerance (1916) - King Nabonidus
 The Little Liar (1916) - Dick Slade
 Atta Boy's Last Race (1916) - Jarvis Johnson
 The Children Pay (1916) - Judge Mason
 Oliver Twist (1916) - Monks
 The Americano (1916) - Salsa Espada
 Lost and Won (1917) - Kirkland Gaige
 A Daughter of the Poor (1917) - James Stevens
 Might and the Man (1917) - Billings
 The Land of Long Shadows (1917) - Constable McKenzie
 The Range Boss (1917) - Willard Masten
 Open Places (1917) - Dan Clark
 Men of the Desert (1917) - Mason
 Peggy Leads the Way (1917) - Roland Gardiner
 New York Luck (1917) - Palter
 In Bad (1918) - Slick Edwards
 The Midnight Trail (1918) - Harvey Faxon
 The Biggest Show on Earth (1918) - Col. Jeffrey Trent
 Hearts or Diamonds? (1918) - Bewley
 Kidder & Ko (1918) - Minor Role
 Up Romance Road (1918) - Count Hilgar Eckstrom
 The Eyes of Julia Deep (1918) - Simon Plummet
 The Bells (1918) - Gari
 The Lady of the Dugout (1918) - Zonie, The Killer
 Hobbs in a Hurry (1918) - Angus MacDonald
 Rosemary Climbs the Heights (1918) - Andrieff
 Wives and Other Wives (1918) - Ted Doubleday
 When a Man Rides Alone (1919) - The Vulture
 The Amazing Impostor (1919) - Robert La Rue
 Where the West Begins (1919) - Gunner McCann
 Brass Buttons (1919) - Cold-Deck Dallas
 The Intrusion of Isabel (1919) - James Harris
 The Unpainted Woman (1919) - Pliny
 The Pagan God (1919) - Henry Addison
 The Sundown Trail (1919) - The Planter
 The Woman Under Cover (1919) - Minor Role
 The Pointing Finger (1919) - Grosset
 The Coast of Opportunity (1920) - Private Secretary
 $30,000 (1920) - Ferdinand Spargo
 Double Adventure (1921) - Jules Fernol
 Society Secrets (1921) - Squire
 One a Minute (1921) - Judge (uncredited)
 Molly O (1921) - The Silhouette Man
 Oliver Twist (1922) - Monks
 Thorns and Orange Blossoms (1922)
 The Call of Home (1922)
 The Half Breed (1922)
 The Darling of New York (1923)
 Tainted Money (1924)
 The Whispered Name (1924)
 The Beautiful Sinner (1924)
 Gold Heels (1924)
 A Son of His Father (1925)
 The Business of Love (1925)
 Bardelys the Magnificent (1926)
 Twinkletoes (1926)
 The Devil's Partner (1926)
 The Notorious Lady (1927)
 See You in Jail (1927)
 The King of Kings (1927) 
 Air Mail Pilot (1928)
 The Shepherd of the Hills (1928)
 The Black Pearl (1928)
 Jazzland (1928)
 The Love Parade (1929)
 The Divorcee (1930)
 Abraham Lincoln (1930)
 Billy the Kid (1930)
 Hell's Island (1930)
 Cimarron (1931)
 A Free Soul (1931)
 Get That Girl (1932)
 The Vampire Bat (1933)
 Turn Back the Clock (1933)
 The Prizefighter and the Lady (1933)
 Laughing Boy (1934)
 The Man Who Reclaimed His Head (1934)
 Mad Love (1935) 
 Dr. Socrates (1935) 
 Revolt of the Zombies (1936)
 Fury (1936) 
 San Francisco (1936) 
 The Gorgeous Hussy (1936) 
 Battle of Greed (1937)
 Lost Horizon (1937)
 Saratoga (1937)
 My Dear Miss Aldrich (1937)
 The Girl Said No (1937)
 Youth on Parole (1937)
 Law for Tombstone (1937)
 Blockade (1938)
 Marie Antoinette (1938)
 King of the Underworld (1939)
 Lucky Night (1939)
 Mr. Smith Goes to Washington (1939)
 The Captain Is a Lady (1940)
 Honky Tonk (1941)
 Unexpected Uncle (1941)
 The Devil and Daniel Webster (1941)
 Miss Polly (1941)
 Ten Gentlemen from West Point (1942)
 The Falcon's Brother (1942)
 Tennessee Johnson (1942)
 Hangmen Also Die! (1943) (final film)

References

External links

1874 births
1953 deaths
American male silent film actors
American male film actors
Male actors from Minnesota
People from Worthington, Minnesota
20th-century American male actors
Vaudeville performers